Sharon Au (born 13 August 1975) is a Singaporean former actress and host. Having joined the TCS during the mid-1990s, she won many awards as an artiste with MediaCorp before taking a sabbatical to pursue university education in 2005 on a scholarship. She returned to MediaCorp to serve her scholarship bond upon graduation in 2011, taking up an office executive position. Nonetheless, she was still invited to host at televised events and theatres.

In February 2018, she resigned amicably from MediaCorp. In October 2018, she found an overseas job as an investment director in a private equity firm based in Paris, France.

Early life and education
She said in an interview that she grew up in a humble and modest apartment, and she is very close to her mother. She also said that she has moderate scoliosis since young, and needs a medical bed at home for her spinal condition.

Au attended CHIJ Saint Nicholas Girls' School (Secondary) and Hwa Chong Junior College in Singapore. She graduated from Waseda University in Tokyo with a Bachelor of Liberal Arts degree in 2011.

Career
Her first job after her GCE 'A' levels was a flight stewardess with Singapore Airlines, Au's career in the entertainment industry began when she was talent-spotted from a Toy Factory Productions English remake of a Hong Kong stage musical I Have A Date With Spring. During the late 1990s she was best known for co-hosting City Beat with Kym Ng and Bryan Wong. She played numerous roles ranging from a cabaret girl in the stage musical, Beauty World to an enthusiastic radio presenter in the sitcom Right Frequency, each receiving rave reviews.

Effectively multilingual, Au established herself amongst top emcee-hosts in Mediacorp alongside Quan Yi Fong and Guo Liang. This is further endorsed when she clinched the Star Awards for Best Variety Show Host for four consecutive years from 2000 to 2003.

Au took a break during the peak of her career and went to Japan for her undergraduate studies in 2005 in the School of International Liberal Studies, Waseda University in Tokyo on a MediaCorp scholarship. She also went to Jean Moulin University Lyon 3 in France for a year as part of Waseda University's One-Year international Exchange Program. Au is multilingual, as she speaks English, Chinese, Japanese, French and basic Spanish.

Au was invited back on a few occasions to be host for some key events, including being the host in Beijing for Singapore Prime Minister's first state visit there and Star Awards 2007. In April 2011, she went back to MediaCorp to serve her 6-year bond. She played host for President Star Charity show in 2012. She made a significant mark in her forties, being one of the 3 key hosts in SEA Games in Singapore's home ground. However, she had been accused of mimicking an Indian accent during the SEA Games opening ceremony. She responded the next day on her Facebook page and apologised the following day. In the same year; she played the female lead, Madam Kwa Geok Choo, in The LKY Musical, alongside actor Adrian Pang, for 37 shows in the Marina Sands Theatre.

In 2012, she started and led styleXstyle.com (a property of MediaCorp Pte Ltd), focusing fashion, beauty and lifestyle. In 2016, she co-founded the Style by Style Vibes cafe when the new Mediacorp campus opened. In 2017, she was appointed as the Publisher for ELLE Singapore as part of Mediacorp's move from print to digital for its print medium.

On 4 January 2018, it was announced that her last day of service in Mediacorp would be on 1 February 2018. styleXstyle.com was later absorbed in 8 Days and ELLE Singapore end January of the same year. Intending to take a year of sabbatical, she instead applied for a job at a private equity firm after spending two months in Paris, France. Since October 2018, she is currently an investment director with the private equity firm in Paris.

Drama
1997
第三类剧场III之油鬼仔 Tales of the 3rd Kind III
心结(电视电影) Hidden Scars
1998
播音人 Right Frequency
1999
播音人II Right Frequency II
2000
新心关系 Soho@Work
播音人III Right Frequency III
2001
大酒店 The Hotel
2002
发财八百万 Lucky Numbers
春到人间 Springs of Life
2004
孩有明天
偶像·爸爸 Oh Dad!
2005
Tiramisu

Variety shows
1995
欢乐大放送 Entertainment Beat
宜康之夜 Econ Night
环岛追追追 Singapore Fun Discovery
午后闲情 Afternoon Leisure Hour
1996
鼠来宝喜迎春 Lunar New Year Special
宜康之夜 Econ Night
欢乐大放送 Entertainment Beat
娱乐新天地 Sunday Variety
TCS Staff Dinner Show
Samsung Show
总统星光慈善 President's Star Charity
搞笑行动 Comedy Night
群星照亮千万心 NKF Charity Show
TCS Olympics Opening/Closing
环岛追追追 Singapore Fun Discovery
欢乐周末夜 Weekend Delight
Eversoft Show
Talent Search Semi-final Show
1997
搞笑行动 Comedy Night
宜康之夜 Econ Night
早安您好 Good Morning Singapore
Kid's Camp
金牛贺岁迎新春 Lunar New Year Show
总统星光慈善 President's Star Charity
环岛追追追 Singapore Fun Discovery
非一般年轻 In Generation
群星照亮千万心 NKF Charity Show
才华横溢出新秀 Star Search Final
超级老街坊 Truly Streetwise
欢乐周末夜 Weekend Delight
Great World City Show
1998
做做朋友 Let's Be Friends
城人杂志 City Beat
虎啸春到嘻洋洋 Lunar New Year Show
歌舞欢腾贺新春 All-Star Variety Show
宜康之夜 Econ Night
群星照亮千万心 NKF Charity Show
总统星光慈善 President's Star Charity
1999
城人杂志City Beat
玉兔贺岁迎丰年 Lunar New Year Show
歌舞欢腾贺新春 All-Star Variety Show
妆艺游行 Chingay '99
群星照亮千万心 NKF Charity Show
欢乐周末夜 Weekend Delight
歌舞今宵 Yesterday Once More
National Day Parade
全星展艺献温情 MCS All-Stars Charity
Millennium Swing Singapore
2000
城人杂志City Beat
千禧祥龙迎新春 Lunar New Year Show
歌舞欢腾贺新春 All-Star Variety Show
欢乐周末夜 Weekend Delight
National Day Parade
群星照亮千万心 NKF Charity Show
心手相连 Affairs of the Heart
2001
城人杂志City Beat
千禧祥龙迎新春 Lunar New Year Show
歌舞欢腾贺新春 All-Star Variety Show
名人Tic Tac Toe Celebrity Squares
群星照亮千万心 NKF Charity Show
欢乐周末夜 Weekend Delight
才华横溢出新秀 Star Search Final
总统星光慈善 President's Star Charity
National Day Parade
2002
城人杂志 City Beat
群星照亮千万心 NKF Charity Show
名人Tic Tac Toe Celebrity Squares
欢乐周末夜 Weekend Delight
名人TicTacToe III TicTacToe III
名人TicTacToe特辑 TicTacToe Special
National Day Parade
城人杂志 新系列
2003
佳居情缘 Living Room
金童玉女心碰心 Perfect Match
National Day Parade
欢乐周末夜 Weekend Delight
才华横溢出新秀 2003 总决赛 Star Search 2003 Finals
2004
群星照亮千万心2004 NKF Charity Show 2004
物物大交换 Barter Trade
道地美食大搜寻 Malaysia Road Feast
威力无比加油战 Spring N Slide
不说你不知 Trivia Trove
普威之夜 2004 PSC Nite 2004
National Day Parade
全情真爱满童心 Children Medical Fund Charity Show
澳妙新滋味 Flavours of Australia
2005
天鸡报喜贺新春 Lunar New Year's Eve Variety Special
群星照亮千万心2005 NKF Charity Show 2005
也许或者有可能II I'm the One
街头美食星 Star Choice
乐在台湾 Naruwan Taiwan
National Day Parade
2007
红星大奖 2007 Star Awards 2007
2011
National Day Parade
2012
National Day Parade
总统星光慈善 President's Star Charity 2012
2015
28th Southeast Asian Games

Theatre
I Have a Date with Spring (in English and Mandarin, 我和春天有个约会), Toy Factory Productions, Singapore, 1995
Beauty World (in Mandarin, 美丽新世界), MediaCorp, Singapore, 1998
Storm (in Mandarin, 雷雨), Toy Factory Productions, Singapore, 1998
A Tinted Edge (in Mandarin, 角色), Toy Factory Productions, Singapore Arts Festival, Singapore, 2000
Chessmaster (in Mandarin, 棋人), Toy Factory Productions, Singapore, 2002
Happy Ghost (in Mandarin, 開心鬼), Spring-Time Stage Productions, Singapore, 2003
The LKY Musical, Metropolitan Productions, Singapore, 2015

Awards and nominations

References

External links
Personal Blog
Archived Bio on MediaCorp TV website

Singaporean women television presenters
Living people
1975 births
Singaporean people of Hokkien descent
Hwa Chong Junior College alumni
CHIJ Saint Nicholas Girls' School alumni
Waseda University alumni
Singaporean expatriates in France